Isaac Scott Hayden (born 22 March 1995) is an English professional footballer who plays as a midfielder for Championship club Norwich City on loan from Newcastle United. Hayden is a product of Arsenal's youth academy.

Early life
Hayden was born in Chelmsford, Essex and played for Southend United until he was 13 years old, when he moved to London to join Arsenal's Academy.

Club career

Arsenal
Hayden made his full debut for Arsenal in the third round of the League Cup in September 2013 against West Bromwich Albion. He started the away match playing in midfield and was substituted after 84 minutes for Kristoffer Olsson. Arsenal eventually won the game on penalties at The Hawthorns. On 23 September 2014, Hayden made a second appearance for Arsenal, playing at centre back in another League Cup third-round game, a 1–2 home defeat against Southampton in September 2014.

Hull City (loan)
On 31 July 2015, Hayden joined Hull City on a season-long loan to gain first team experience. Hayden made his debut for the club on the opening day of the 2015–16 season in a 2–0 home win to Huddersfield Town. Hayden opened his account when he scored the final goal for Hull in the 6–0 defeat of Charlton Athletic on 16 January 2016.

Newcastle United

On 11 July 2016, Hayden signed for Newcastle United on a five-year contract. Hayden scored his first goal for Newcastle in a 4–1 win over Reading on 17 August 2016. Hayden went on to win the 2016–17 Championship with Newcastle in May 2017.

Following promotion Hayden secured a place in the Newcastle team under the management of Rafael Benítez as a defensive midfielder. Following the departure of Benitez in 2019, Steve Bruce continued to play Hayden as a midfielder and at right back. Hayden scored the winning goal in a 2020 mid-season 1–0 win against Chelsea with a last minute header in stoppage time.

After suffering a long-term injury in December 2021, Hayden was not named in the Newcastle United 25-man Premier League squad for the second half of the 2021–22 season.

On 14 March 2022, Hayden was fined £19,000 by The Football Association after complaining on Twitter about referee David Coote's performance following Newcastle's 1–0 defeat at Chelsea.

Norwich City (loan)
On 7 June 2022, Hayden joined Championship club Norwich City on a season-long loan.

International career
Hayden was born in England to an English mother and Jamaican father, and is eligible to represent both national teams. Hayden has represented England at the under-16, under-17, under-18, under-19, under-20 and under-21 levels of football.

Hayden declared his ambition to play for England at senior level in September 2019, but changed track in March 2021, when he personally contacted the Jamaican Football Federation to express his interest in playing for the Jamaica team. This came at a time when the Jamaican Football Federation announced its intention to target call-ups for up a number of English players with Jamaican heritage, in order to improve the national team's chances of qualifying for the 2022 World Cup.

Style of play
Arsène Wenger has described Hayden as a player whose key assets are concentration, intelligence and strength. Equally comfortable at centre-back or in central midfield, whilst having also previously featured at right-back and as a playmaker.

Personal life
Hayden is married to Lauren Hayden. Their daughter Adriana was born in 2017.

Career statistics

Honours
Newcastle United
EFL Championship: 2016–17

References

External links

Isaac Hayden profile at Arsenal.com
England profile at The FA

1995 births
Living people
Sportspeople from Chelmsford
Footballers from Essex
English footballers
England youth international footballers
Association football midfielders
Southend United F.C. players
Arsenal F.C. players
Hull City A.F.C. players
Newcastle United F.C. players
Norwich City F.C. players
English Football League players
Premier League players
Black British sportspeople
English people of Jamaican descent